Theretra boisduvalii is a moth of the  family Sphingidae.

Distribution 
It is found from south-eastern Iran, east to Sri Lanka and through the highlands of the Himalaya to south-east Asia and Borneo. They sometimes stray into Turkey and Greece.

Description 
The wingspan is 85–110 mm.

Biology 
The larvae feed on Vitis and Parthenocissus species.

References

External links
Lepiforum.de

Theretra
Moths described in 1839
Moths of the Middle East